Andrew Bridge (born 5 October 1979) is a British professional basketball player. Bridge is a 6 ft 4 in shooting guard. Bridge is the current captain of Newcastle Eagles.

Biography
The 6 ft 3in shooting guard started his career with Mansfield Express in 1999 in the English Basketball League, before stepping up to Professional Basketball with the Sheffield Sharks in 2000. In 2002, the England and Great Britain International moved further North to play for the Newcastle Eagles.

Andrew was part of the Bronze Medal-winning England Basketball Team at the 2006 Commonwealth Games in Melbourne, Australia and completed a successful season with the Newcastle Eagles "clean sweep" of Championships in 2006.

"A shooting guard, he can also handle the ball competently and is best known for his solid defence and smart basketball brain.  A real all-rounder and rapidly becoming the glue that helps hold the team together".

As of 27 March 2011 the official British Basketball League website shows Bridge has played 324 games, with averages of 7.47 Points Per Game, 2.97 Rebounds Per Game and 0.97 Assists Per Game.

References

1979 births
Living people
Basketball players at the 2006 Commonwealth Games
Commonwealth Games bronze medallists for England
Commonwealth Games medallists in basketball
English men's basketball players
Newcastle Eagles players
Sheffield Sharks players
Shooting guards
Sportspeople from Chesterfield, Derbyshire
Medallists at the 2006 Commonwealth Games